Forstater is an English-language surname. As of 2014, it was held by 65 people in the United States and 5 people in England.

Notable people 
 Mark Forstater (b. 1943), British film producer
 Maya Forstater (b. 1973), daughter of Mark and British researcher and feminist.

References

English-language surnames